Banjos is a genus of marine ray-finned fish, the only genus in the monotypic family Banjosidae, part of the perciform superfamily Percoidea They are native to the western Indian and the Atlantic coasts of Africa. and is made up of the three species of banjofishes.

Species
Banjos has three species currently recognised species:

 Banjos aculeatus Matsunuma & Motomura, 2017 (Eastern Australian banjofish)
 Banjos banjos (John Richardson, 1846) (Banjofish)
 Banjos peregrinus Matsunuma & Motomura, 2017 (Timor Sea banjofish)

References

Percoidea
Banjosidae
Ray-finned fish genera